This is a list of Osamu Tezuka's manga work in alphabetical order. The English translations of the names used are from the original names found on the official Osamu Tezuka website.

This is not a complete list of Tezuka's manga creations. While Tezuka created more than 700 manga series during his life, this list focuses on what his official website deems his more notable works by having individual pages devoted. Also counted among them are manga from the Osamu Tezuka Manga Complete Works collection published by Kodansha.

0-9

A

B

C

D

E

F

G

H

I

J

L

M

N

O

P

Q

R

S

T

U

V

W

X

Y

Z

See also
Osamu Tezuka
List of Osamu Tezuka anime
Osamu Tezuka's Star System

References

 
Osamu Tezuka
Osamu Tezuka